Chutney parang or parang chutney is a style of music that is a cross between Venezuela, Colombia, and Trinidad and Tobago's traditional Christmas music, parang and Indo-Trinidadian chutney music. It is sung in English, Hindustani, and Spanish.

Folk music genres
Trinidad and Tobago styles of music